John Thomas Stanton (June 2, 1921 – February 1, 1989) was an American professional basketball player. He appeared in seven games for the Anderson Duffey Packers in the National Basketball League during the 1946–47 season.

Stanton spent one semester attending Villanova University before transferring to Loyola University Chicago, where he played varsity basketball from his sophomore through senior seasons.

References

1921 births
1989 deaths
United States Army personnel of World War II
American men's basketball players
Anderson Packers players
Basketball players from Chicago
Guards (basketball)
Loyola Ramblers men's basketball players
Military personnel from Illinois
Villanova University alumni